Zambrzyce-Kapusty  is a village in the administrative district of Gmina Rutki, in Zambrów County, Podlaskie Voivodeship, in north-eastern Poland.

References

Zambrzyce-Kapusty